The Bipi language is the westernmost West Manus language. It is spoken by approximately 1200 people on the Bipi and Sisi Islands off the west coast of Manus Island, Manus Province of Papua New Guinea. It has SVO word order.

References

External links 
 Kaipuleohone's Blust collection includes materials on Bipi language.

Manus languages
Languages of Manus Province
Subject–verb–object languages